Patrik Twardzik (born 10 February 1993) is a Czech footballer who plays as a midfielder for German club Rot Weiss Ahlen.

Early life
Twardzik was born in the Czech Republic but educated in Germany as his father played football there.

Club career
Twardzik and twin brother Filip started off their careers with Sachsen Leipzig before being signed by Hertha Berlin. On 1 February 2009, they were both signed by Celtic, a week before their 16th birthday. Filip and Patrik both suspended their education when they moved to Celtic. Their mother also moved to Scotland to help them adjust to their new life.

In September 2012, Twardzik signed a contract extension with the club, which will keep him until 2014. After a year, Twardzik joined Scottish Championship side Livingston on loan that will keep him until January. Twardzik made his debut for the club on 23 November 2013, where he set up a goal, in a 5–1 victory over Greenock Morton. After appearing two substitute appearances for the club, Twardzik returned to his parent club. At the end of the season, Twardzik was released by the club upon his expiry of his contract and separating his twin brother.

In November 2014 he joined the reserve team of his youth club FC Rot-Weiß Erfurt.

Twardzik signed for Rot Weiss Ahlen in 2021.

Personal life
His twin brother Filip, a midfielder, plays for Bolton. His older brother, Dan, plays for Motherwell as a goalkeeper. His father, René, was also a goalkeeper and played for Sachsen Leipzig.

Career statistics

References

External links

Living people
1993 births
Sportspeople from Třinec
Association football midfielders
Czech footballers
Czech twins
Twin sportspeople
Czech Republic youth international footballers
Scottish Professional Football League players
3. Liga players
Regionalliga players
Celtic F.C. players
Livingston F.C. players
Rot Weiss Ahlen players
Czech expatriate footballers
Czech expatriate sportspeople in Scotland
Expatriate footballers in Scotland
Czech expatriate sportspeople in Germany
Expatriate footballers in Germany